Premier Radio may refer to:

 Premier Christian Radio, a radio network in the United Kingdom which broadcasts Christian programming
 Premiere Radio Networks, a radio network in the United States which syndicates talk and other programming to radio stations